The 1965–66 Cypriot Cup was the 24th edition of the Cypriot Cup. A total of 13 clubs entered the competition. It began with the first round on 4 June 1966 and concluded on 29 June 1966 with the final which was held at GSP Stadium (1902). Apollon won their 1st Cypriot Cup trophy after beating Nea Salamis 4–2 in the final.

Sources

See also
 Cypriot Cup
 1965–66 Cypriot First Division

Cypriot Cup seasons
1965–66 domestic association football cups
1965–66 in Cypriot football